Amarok may refer to:

Music
 Amarok (band), a Spanish progressive rock band
 Amarok (Mike Oldfield album), 1990
 Amarok (Nargaroth album), 2000
 Amarok, 2010 album by Francisco López (musician)

Other uses
 Amarok (wolf), in Inuit mythology
 Amarok (software), an open-source audio player named after a Mike Oldfield album
 Volkswagen Amarok, a pickup truck